The Castle-class minesweeper was a highly seaworthy naval trawler adapted for patrol, anti-submarine warfare and minesweeping duties and  built to Admiralty specifications. Altogether 197 were built in the United Kingdom between 1916 and 1919, with others built in Canada, India and later New Zealand. Many saw service in the Second World War.

First World War
The Castle class originated with the commercial trawler Raglan Castle of 1915, taken up for Royal Navy service. The design was adapted by Smith's Dock Company Ltd to Admiralty requirements for building in quantity.

During World War I, 145 were built in the United Kingdom for the Admiralty. The names of the vessels were derived from the official crew rosters of ships at the Battle of Trafalgar. The first standard vessel, Nathaniel Cole, was delivered in May 1917. After the war 52 further ships on order were completed as fishing vessels and many of the minesweepers were converted for commercial use. 20 ships were also cancelled, but many were completed by the shipbuilders for commercial owners.

The Admiralty also ordered 60 Castle-class trawlers from Canadian shipyards, the TR series, which were loaned to the Royal Canadian Navy for seaward defence of the east coast of Canada. Some entered service with the United States Navy. Nine ships were also built in India with teak planking on steel frames.

Second World War

Many Castle-class trawlers were among the civilian trawlers requisitioned by the Royal Navy for use in World War II. The majority were employed as minesweepers, with others serving as auxiliary patrol vessels, boom defense vessels, danlayers, Essos (fuel carriers), torpedo recovery vessels and water carriers. Many had multiple roles over the course of the war. After the end of the war, most of those that had survived were either sold or returned to their owners.

German captured
Early in World War II, ten Canadian-built trawlers that had been sold into commercial service after World War I with a number of European countries were captured by the Germans when they overran France, Belgium and Norway and put in Kriegsmarine service.

New Zealand additions
In 1940, the New Zealand Government, facing a requirement for minesweepers to operate in home waters, directed the building of 13 Castle-class naval trawlers in New Zealand to add to the two vessels, James Cosgrove and Wakakura, they had previously purchased. The Castle-class design was chosen over more modern alternatives because it was simple enough to be built with the country's limited ship construction facilities.

Ships in class

Non-standard

Standard

Cancelled

Canadian-built
See TR series minesweeping trawler.

Indian-built

New Zealand-built
See Castle class trawlers of the Royal New Zealand Navy.

References

Sources 

 
 
 
 
 
 
 
 
 
 

 
Mine warfare vessel classes
 
Ship classes of the Royal Navy